Gaddamanugu Konduru (G. Konduru) is a part of Vijayawada and a village in NTR district of the Indian state of Andhra Pradesh.

See also 
List of villages in Krishna district

References 

Villages in Krishna district
Mandal headquarters in Krishna district